John H. Boylan State Airport  is a state-owned public-use airport located three nautical miles (6 km) southeast of the central business district of Island Pond, in Essex County, Vermont, United States.

Facilities and aircraft 
The airport is named for John H. Boylan, a political figure who served as President pro tempore of the Vermont State Senate.  It covers an area of 188 acres (76 ha) at an elevation of 1,194 feet (364 m) above mean sea level. It has one runway designated 14/32 with a turf surface measuring 2,650 by 120 feet (808 x 37 m).

For the 12-month period ending August 11, 2010, the airport had 200 general aviation aircraft operations, an average of 16 per month. At that time there were five aircraft based at this airport: 60% single-engine and 40% ultralight.

References

External links 
 John H. Boylan (5B1) at Vermont Airport Directory
 Aerial image as of May 1999 from USGS The National Map
 

Airports in Vermont
Transportation buildings and structures in Essex County, Vermont